Erewash may refer to:

 Borough of Erewash, a local government district in the county of Derbyshire, England
 Erewash Valley, is the valley of the River Erewash 
 River Erewash, river in England
 Erewash (UK Parliament constituency), Derbyshire constituency in the British House of Commons
 Erewash Canal, broad canal in Derbyshire
 Erewash Valley line, a branch line from Chesterfield to Long Eaton
 Erewash Museum, Ilkeston
 Erewash Sound, is a community radio station broadcasting to the borough of Erewash